Rhae-Christie Shaw (born 20 November 1975) is a Canadian former road cyclist. She participated at the 2011 UCI Road World Championships and 2012 UCI Road World Championships. Shaw was the winner of the criterium at the 2012 Canadian National Road Championships, and won a silver medal in the time trial at the 2012 Pan American Cycling Championships.

Major results

2011
 1st Stage 2 (ITT) Tour Féminin en Limousin
 3rd Time trial, National Road Championships
 3rd Overall Tour de Bretagne Féminin
1st Stages 2 (ITT) & 3
 6th Overall Sea Otter Classic
 7th Time trial, UCI Road World Championships
 8th Overall Tour of the Gila
2012
 National Road Championships
1st  Criterium
2nd Time trial
 2nd  Time trial, Pan American Road Championships
 6th Chrono Gatineau
 8th Overall Tour of Elk Grove
2013
 3rd Overall Redlands Bicycle Classic
 6th Overall San Dimas Stage Race
2015
 1st Stage 2 (ITT) Redlands Bicycle Classic

References

External links
 

1975 births
Canadian female cyclists
Living people
Place of birth missing (living people)
Sportspeople from Seattle
People from Essex County, Ontario